The table below shows all results of Peugeot Sport in World Rally Championship.

Group B Era (1984–1986)

Kit Car Era (1997–1998)

World Rally Car Era (1999–2005)

External links
ewrc-results.com.cvom

Peugeot
World Rally Championship constructor results